Funeral March of a Marionette is a short piece by Charles Gounod. It was originally written for solo piano in 1872 and orchestrated in 1879. It is perhaps best known as the theme music for the television program Alfred Hitchcock Presents.

Background
While residing in London, England, between 1871 and 1872, Gounod started to write a suite for piano called Suite burlesque. After completing this piece, Gounod abandoned the rest of the suite. The piece was dedicated to Madame Viguier, a pianist and the wife of Alfred Viguier, the first violin in the Orchestre de la Société des Concerts du Conservatoire.

In 1879, he orchestrated the piece with piccolo, flute, 2 oboes, 2 clarinets in A, 2 bassoons, 2 horns in D, 2 trumpets in A, 3 trombones, ophicleide, timpani, bass drum, cymbals, triangle, and strings.

The work is in the key of D minor with a central section in D major; the time signature is 6/8.

Storyline
The following storyline underlies the "Funeral March of a Marionette":
The Marionette has died in a duel.
The funeral procession commences (D minor).
A central section (D major) depicts the mourners taking refreshments before returning to the funeral march (D minor).

Additionally, inscriptions are found throughout the score as follows:
 (The marionette is broken!!!)
 (Murmurs of regret from the troupe)
 (The procession)
 (Here many of the principal personages stop for refreshments)
 (Return to the house)

Use in films and television
The music was used to accompany at least three films in the late 1920s:
Sunrise: A Song of Two Humans (1927; silent), directed by F. W. Murnau
Habeas Corpus (1928; silent), with Laurel and Hardy.
Welcome Danger (1929), Harold Lloyd's first sound film.

Alfred Hitchcock had heard the music in the 1927 film Sunrise: A Song of Two Humans. In 1955, when choosing the theme music for his television series Alfred Hitchcock Presents, he remembered the effect that "Funeral March of a Marionette" had on him. It was through Hitchcock's program that the music achieved its widest audience, although few people would have been able to identify the composer or title. The series continued for ten years, and the theme music appeared in five versions by as many arrangers: in 1955, 1960, 1962, 1963, and 1964 ‒ the last version being arranged by Bernard Herrmann, who transposed the piece up a third. The "Funeral March of a Marionette" was one of eight compositions that Hitchcock selected to take to a fictional desert island on the 1959 BBC radio program, Desert Island Discs.

References

External links

Recording, "Funeral March of a Marionette by Sousa's Band (1903)", archive.org

Compositions by Charles Gounod
1872 compositions
Funerary and memorial compositions
Compositions in D minor
Compositions for solo piano
Compositions for symphony orchestra
Alfred Hitchcock